Robert Maunsell Evans (4 May 1808 – 1 May 1890) was Archdeacon of Cloyne  from 1862 until 1873.

Evans was born in County Limerick, educated at Trinity College, Dublin and ordained in 1833. After  curacies at Ogonnelloe, Bandon and Ballyhea he became Rector of  Gortroe and Dysert before his appointment as Archdeacon.

He died on 1 May 1890.

References

1808 births
1890 deaths
Clergy from County Limerick
Alumni of Trinity College Dublin
Archdeacons of Cloyne